The 1978 Minnesota Twins finished 73–89, fourth in the American League West.

Offseason 
 October 3, 1977: Jim Hughes was released by the Twins.
 October 3, 1977: Steve Luebber was released by the Twins.
 October 25, 1977: Bombo Rivera was purchased by the Twins from the Montreal Expos.
 December 6, 1977: Jesús Vega was drafted by the Twins from the Milwaukee Brewers in the minor league draft.
 January 10, 1978: Jesse Orosco was drafted by the Twins in the 2nd round of the 1978 Major League Baseball draft.
 March 23, 1978: Don Carrithers was released by the Twins.

Regular season 
On May 7, shortstop Roy Smalley Jr. set a Twins record by drawing five walks in a 15-9 win over the Baltimore Orioles.  Smalley went 1 for 1 and scored three times.

Third baseman Mike Cubbage, on July 27, became the fifth Twin to hit for the cycle (following Rod Carew, 1970; César Tovar, 1972; Larry Hisle, 1976 and Lyman Bostock, 1976).  Cubbage went double, homer, single, triple off Toronto Blue Jays' pitching.  In subsequent years, five others will match the feat: Gary Ward, 1980; Kirby Puckett, 1986; Carlos Gómez, 2008; Jason Kubel, 2009; and Michael Cuddyer, 2009.

787,878 fans attended Twins games, the second lowest total in the American League. Only one Twins player made the All-Star Game: first baseman Rod Carew.  In that game at San Diego Stadium, Carew—in his twelfth consecutive All-Star appearance—performed an All-Star first by hitting two triples in the game.

Carew won his seventh AL batting title with a .333 average, leading the team in hits and runs scored. Shortstop Roy Smalley hit 19 HR and collected 77 RBI. Dan Ford hit 11 HR and collected 82 RBI.

Reliever Mike Marshall was signed in May and replaced Tom Johnson and Bill Campbell as manager Gene Mauch's all-purpose reliever. Marshall went on to rack up 10 relief wins along with 21 saves. Three starters had double digit wins: Dave Goltz (15-10), Roger Erickson (14-13), and Geoff Zahn (14-14).

Season standings

Record vs. opponents

Opening Day starters 
Rod Carew
Dan Ford
Craig Kusick
Willie Norwood
Bob Randall
Bombo Rivera
Roy Smalley
Larry Wolfe
Butch Wynegar
Geoff Zahn

Notable transactions 
 May 15, 1978: Mike Marshall was signed as a free agent by the Twins.
 June 6, 1978: 1978 Major League Baseball draft
Lenny Faedo was drafted by the Twins in the 1st round (16th pick).
Kent Hrbek was drafted by the Twins in the 17th round.

Roster

Player stats

Batting

Starters by position 
Note: Pos = Position; G = Games played; AB = At bats; H = Hits; Avg. = Batting average; HR = Home runs; RBI = Runs batted in

Other batters 
Note: G = Games played; AB = At bats; H = Hits; Avg. = Batting average; HR = Home runs; RBI = Runs batted in

Pitching

Starting pitchers 
Note: G = Games pitched; IP = Innings pitched; W = Wins; L = Losses; ERA = Earned run average; SO = Strikeouts

Other pitchers 
Note: G = Games pitched; IP = Innings pitched; W = Wins; L = Losses; ERA = Earned run average; SO = Strikeouts

Relief pitchers 
Note: G = Games pitched; W = Wins; L = Losses; SV = Saves; ERA = Earned run average; SO = Strikeouts

Farm system 

LEAGUE CHAMPIONS: Visalia, Elizabethton

Notes

References 
Player stats from www.baseball-reference.com
Team info from www.baseball-almanac.com

Minnesota Twins seasons
Minnesota Twins season
Minnesota Twins